The Malaysia National Basketball League (Petronas-Molten Malaysia National Basketball League for sponsorship reason), often abbreviated to the MNBL, was the pre-eminent men's basketball league in Malaysia, organised by the Malaysia Basketball Association (MABA). The competition started as Malaysian Basketball League (MBL) in 1981. In 2002, MABA appointed Mr. Tan Kee Hian to handle the competition and changed the league's name to Malaysia National Basketball League (MNBL).

MNBL commissioner Tan Kee Hian announced on 24 July 2011, after the grand final of 2011 MNBL, that they would take a break from the privately owned national league "after 10 years of struggling to keep the league afloat due to the lack of sponsors and teams". The new league was established as Malaysia Pro League.

Clubs 
Five teams have competed in the 2013 Malaysia National Basketball League season:

Older defunct clubs

Defunct date unknown 

  Good Will Sports Club
  Pandan Jaya Sports Club
  Perak Red Eagles
  Petronas Basketball Team
  PKNS B.C.
  Sarawak Hornbills
  Segamat Rimba Timor
  Selangor Basketball Association
  Selangor Dragons

MNBL League Championships

Malaysia National Basketball League (MNBL)

MNBL Champions Cup

MNBL Champions Cup (MNBL)

Most Valuable Players (MVP)

Foreign players/coaches 

  Perak Farmcochem
  Gareth John Murray (2009)
  Jason Killeen (2010)
  Raymond Canady Jr. (2009)
  Chris Kuete (2011–13)
  Bryson McKenzie (2011)
  Gaston Essengue (2011)
  Chris Garnett (2012)
  Lashawn Monteze Malloy (2013)
  Sarawak Rainbow
  Chris Kuete (2009)
  Matthew R. Smith (2010)
  Kenny Harris (2009)
  Samuel Emany Meka (2007–08)
  Abdul Rahman Taher (2007–08)
  Kuala Lumpur Dragons
  Alex Hartman (2010)
  Donnie Stith (2010)
  Waki Williams (2011)
  Anthony Michael Kent (2011)
  Richard Alonzo (2011)
   Moala Tautuaa (2012)
  Patrick Cabahug (2012)
   Avery Scharer (2013)
  Travis Ernest Darnell Hyman (2013)
  Sabah Kinsabina Group
  Marcus T. Robinson (2010)
  Christoher Allen Baldwin (2010)
  Melaka Chinwoo
  Ben Knight (2009)
  Disney Jay Gabonada (2007–08)
  Tom Ode Ochefu (2007–08)
  Segamat Basketball Association
  Amani Bin Daanish (2009)
  Selangor SM Land
  Chris Kuete (2007–08)
  Singapore Siglap
  Al Vergara (2011)
  Antoine Broxsie (2011)
  Sarawak Fire Horse
  Gene Anthony Johnson (2011–13)
  Nathaniel Michael Pilgrim (2011)
  Mark Musgrave (2011)
  Devon Sullivan (2012)
  Robert Jones (2013)
  Benson Andrew Lee (2013)
  Goran Veg (2013)
  Penang Stallions
  Philip Turner (2012)
  Uche Echefu (2012)
  Kelantan Warriors
  Jonathan Bruce Kreft (2013)
  Devon Sullivan (2013)
  Kelvin McNeil Jr. (2013)
  Bintulu Eagles
  Raymond Canady Jr. (2013)
  Caleb Patterson (2013)
  Philip Turner (2013)
  Sarawak Rainbow
  Arturo "Bai" Cristobal
  Kuala Lumpur Dragons
  Paul Daniel Advincula
  Joseph Dolcetti
  Ariel Vanguardia (2011–13)
  Sabah Kinsabina Group
  Hilario P. Galabin Jr.
  Melaka Chinwoo
  David Zamar
  Selangor SM Land
  Paul Daniel Advincula
  Perak Farmcochem
  Paul Daniel Advincula (2011–12)
  Antolin Zamar (2013)
  Sarawak Fire Horse
  Nomar Isla (2011–13)
  Adam James Steere (2013)
  Singapore Siglap
  Neo Nam Kheng (2011)
  Bintulu Eagles
  Adriano Papa Jr. (2013)

References

External links 

 Malaysia Basketball Association official website
 Malaysian basketball on Asia-Basket.com website
 National Basketball League official website

 
Basketball in Malaysia
Basketball leagues in Asia